Cahone is an unincorporated village in western Dolores County, Colorado, United States, about 9 miles southeast of Dove Creek straddling U.S. Highway 491. There is a  post office there, and a large bean farm with storage and processing facility, and also a small bar and grill; but no grocery or automobile service facilities or tourist lodgings, or other businesses or services.

History
The Ansel Hall Ruin, also known as the Cahone Ruin, was a prehistoric North San Juan pueblo from the 1000–1499 AD period which has been listed on the National Register of Historic Places since 1997. The town of Cahone was established about 1912.  The town was named by Bert Ballenger, later the town's first postmaster, for a nearby canyon named El Cajón in Spanish, meaning little box. The Cahone Post Office opened on May 21, 1916.

See also

Outline of Colorado
Index of Colorado-related articles
State of Colorado
Colorado cities and towns
Colorado counties
Dolores County, Colorado
Old Spanish National Historic Trail
Prehistoric sites of Colorado

References

External links

Unincorporated communities in Dolores County, Colorado
Unincorporated communities in Colorado